The Fuller Brush Girl is a 1950 slapstick comedy starring Lucille Ball and directed by Lloyd Bacon. Animator Frank Tashlin wrote the script. Ball plays a quirky door-to-door cosmetics saleswoman for the Fuller Brush Company. The film also stars Eddie Albert and has an uncredited cameo by Red Skelton (who had starred in the Tashlin-scripted  and S. Sylvan Simon directed The Fuller Brush Man two years earlier). The film reunites Lucille Ball with director Lloyd Bacon, producer S. Sylvan Simon and Frank Tashlin at Columbia Pictures after their 1949 film Miss Grant Takes Richmond.

Plot

Sally and Humphrey, who work together at the same steamship company (she as a switchboard operator, he as an office boy), wish to be able to afford monthly payments on a house they have long wanted to buy. Their boss, Harvey Simpson, unaccountably gives Humphrey a big promotion. Harvey is involved in a smuggling job which requires an oblivious patsy and it has been determined that Humphrey is it. Thrilled with this promotion, the couple are now able to go ahead and put their down-payment on the house.

Sally, however, while conferring with a friend about the friend's job with Fuller Brush, manages to accidentally destroy the switchboard and cover her boss with Fuller Brush powder; she is subsequently fired. She decides to apply for her own Fuller Brush franchise, but requires a reference from her former employer.

Borrowing her friend's kit, Sally sets out to prove she would be a good saleswoman without having to obtain the reference. A series of catastrophes ensues and, when Mr. and Mrs. Simpson are each found dead, Sally becomes the prime suspect.

Sally and Humphrey identify the real culprit and pursue her to her job dancing at a burlesque theater (where Sally has to take the stage as a means of disguise), and then onto a departing ocean liner. Humphrey becomes aware that he has been set up as a fall guy in a smuggling enterprise. Hilarity ensues as the pair are chased around the ship by a criminal gang trying to silence them, while they leap out a porthole into the ship's hold and then hide variously in rooms filled with leaky wine barrels, bunches of bananas, and a pair of talking parrots who nearly give them away.

Cast
Lucille Ball as Sally Elliot
Eddie Albert as Humphrey Briggs
Carl Benton Reid as Mr. Christy
Gale Robbins as Ruby Rawlings
Jeff Donnell as Jane Bixby
Jerome Cowan as Harvey Simpson
John Litel as Mr. Watkins
Fred Graham as Rocky Mitchell
Lee Patrick as Claire Simpson
Arthur Space as Insp. Rodgers
Mel Blanc as two parrots (voice only)
Barbara Pepper as Woman Watching TV 
Red Skelton as Fuller Brush Man

External links

1950 films
American black-and-white films
Columbia Pictures films
1950s English-language films
Films directed by Lloyd Bacon
1950s comedy mystery films
American slapstick comedy films
Films with screenplays by Frank Tashlin
American comedy mystery films
Films scored by Heinz Roemheld
1950s American films